The Super Bowl XXXI halftime show took place on January 26, 1997 at the Louisiana Superdome in New Orleans, Louisiana. The show was titled "Blues Brothers Bash" and featured actors Dan Aykroyd, John Goodman, and Jim Belushi as The Blues Brothers. The show highlighted blues music and also had performances by the rock band ZZ Top and singer James Brown.

Background and development
The show's producers were Select Productions, Radio City, and House of Blues.

The show's sponsor was Oscar Mayer.

While practicing for the show, stuntwoman Laura "Dinky" Patterson, one of a 16-member professional bungee jumping team, jumped from the 152-foot high temporary show truss hung from the roof and collided head-first with the concrete floor, causing her death. The New York Times reported on January 29, 1997 that Patterson had been working with bungee cords that were being handled by volunteers who had received little training. The bungee-jumping portion of the halftime show was removed. A title-graphic commemorating Patterson and acknowledging her death was displayed during the TV broadcast of the Super Bowl.

The inclusion of a segment featuring Fox News Channel personality Catherine Crier was seen as an attempt for Fox, broadcasting their first-ever Super Bowl, to give their news channel free publicity.

The show was intended to create hype for the then-upcoming film Blues Brothers 2000. 

Since original Blues Brother John Belushi had died fifteen years prior, remaining member Dan Aykroyd performed instead with Jim Belushi and John Goodman.

Synopsis
The show began with a fictional Fox News bulletin presented by Catherine Crier, announcing that Aykroyd's Blues Brothers character Elwood J. Blues had escaped the Joliet State Prison.

The Blues Brothers then performed the songs "Everybody Needs Somebody to Love" and "Soul Man".

James Brown, wearing a pink satin suit, then performed his songs "I Got You (I Feel Good)" and "Get Up (I Feel Like Being a) Sex Machine".

ZZ Top then appeared, entering on motorcycles, and performed their songs "Tush" and "Legs".

All the performers ended the show by performing "Gimme Some Lovin'" together.

Reception

Critical
Steve Johnson of the Chicago Tribune heavily criticized the show, particularly  The Blues Brothers, likening the inclusion of ZZ Top and James Brown to placing prime roast beef "between moldy white bread". He also argued that The Blues Brothers were only chosen to act as "a stealth ad for the House of Blues chain of musical malls."

Many outlets have retrospectively ranked the show poorly among Super Bowl halftime shows. In 2019, Maeve McDermott of USA Today ranked the show as the second-most "disastrous" Super Bowl halftime show. Also in 2019, Roy Trakin and Jem Aswad of Variety magazine ranked as one of the six "least memorable" Super Bowl halftime shows.

Conversely, in 2013, Dan Hyman of Rolling Stone magazine retrospectively ranked the show as the eighth-best Super Bowl halftime show. In 2020, Aaron Tallent of Athlon Sports ranked the show well, writing, "This performance epitomizes what a Super Bowl halftime show should be: big and fun, but not overdone and torturous to watch." In 2020, Daniel Tran of Yardbarker also ranked the performance well.

Commercial
Upon release on February 6, 1998, Blues Brothers 2000 received mixed reviews and was a box-office bomb.

Setlist
 "Everybody Needs Somebody to Love" (The Blues Brothers)
 "Soul Man" (The Blues Brothers)
 "I Got You (I Feel Good)" (James Brown)
 "Get Up (I Feel Like Being a) Sex Machine" (James Brown)
 "Tush" (ZZ Top)
 "Legs" (ZZ Top)
 "Gimme Some Lovin'" (The Blues Brothers, James Brown, ZZ Top)

Controversy
Some criticized the decision to have a faux news bulletin, which some may have mistaken as real. The segment was criticized as undermining the upstart Fox News Channel's journalistic integrity, as well as Crier's own.

References

1997 in American music
1997 in American television
1997 in Louisiana
January 1996 events in the United States
Mass media in New Orleans
The Blues Brothers
James Brown
ZZ Top
031
Radio City Music Hall